Proposition 16, also known as the Chiropractic Initiatives Act, was a California initiated state statute proposed and passed in 1922 to allow for the creation of a state board of chiropractic examiners. Proposition 16 passed with 481,600 Yes votes, representing 59.5 percent of the total votes cast. On the same day, voters approved a similar health care reform, Proposition 20, which allowed for the creation of a state board of osteopathic examiners.

At the time of the vote, 22 states had already passed laws similar to Proposition 16.

Official summary
Allowed for the creation of the California Board of Chiropractic Examiners with members appointed by the governor and paid for from receipts under the act.
Prohibited the practice of chiropractic without a license from a board-approved institution.
Required board-approved institutions to have at minimum 2400 hours of classroom time with minimum hourly requirements for set topics
Allowed for the state board to revoke a chiropractic license

Results of vote

References

External links
Board of Chiropractic Examiners Initiative Act

1922 California ballot propositions